The 1912 Italian Athletics Championships  were held in Verona. it was the 7th edition of the Italian Athletics Championships.

Champions

References

External links 
 Italian Athletics Federation

Italian Athletics Championships
Italian Athletics Outdoor Championships
1912 in Italian sport